Ammo Bomma ( My God! Toy!) is a 2001 Indian Telugu-language horror comedy film, produced by D. Lata Mahesh under the Sirisha Productions banner and directed by Relangi Narasimha Rao. It stars Rajendra Prasad, Suman, Seema, Uma  and music composed by Shanmuk. The film is a remake of the Marathi movie Zapatlela (1993) which itself was inspired by 1988 Hollywood movie Child's Play. The film was an average grosser at the box office.

Plot
The film begins on Gangaram (Satya Prakash) a deadly gangster, as his life is a blank wall, he approaches a powerful wizard Malabar Baba and acquires the knowledge of Parakaya Pravesha, which means one's own soul entering into another's body. Thereafter, Inspector Mahesh (Suman) a powerful police officer onslaughts on him. Severely injured Gangaram lands at a post office and transfers his soul into a doll nearby. Aside, Rambabu (Rajendra Prasad) a ventriloquist at Eluru, whom the doll holding Gangaram's soul is delivered, presented by his cousin Sowmya (Seema), from the USA. Here, Rambabu amours a girl Lakshmi (Uma) which is rejected by her father Constable Nukka Raju (Mallikarjuna Rao) as he aspires to couple up his daughter with his subordinate Cola (Sudhakar). Meanwhile, Sowmya returns for pursuing a Ph.D. in Criminal Psychology. Accordingly, she is acquainted with Mahesh and they fall in love. Once Rambabu insults his house owner Janardhan Seth (Tanikella Bharani) in the show for which he seals his belongings including the Gangaram doll. Thereupon, Gangaram slays out Janardhan Seth, perceiving the dirty deed angered Rambabu reaches Janardhan Seth's house where he spots him dead. Just after, Mahesh arrives, judges Rambabu as the culprit and arrests him. In jail, Rambabu desperately tries to explain reality but fails. Thereafter, Gangaram absconds to Hyderabad, the post-mortem report proves the innocence of Rambabu and he is freed. At present, Gangaram contacts Malabar Baba and seeks transformation into a mortal human body. Affrightened Baba reveals that he can attain the mortal body of the 1st person who knows his secret i.e. Rambabu. Soon, Gangaram backs up with his henchman Deva (Jeeva). During the interval, Mahesh finds whereabouts of Malabar Baba, learns the truth and the only way for relieving Gangaram's soul is to shoot in between his eyebrows before he enters into Rambabu's body. Immediately, Mahesh flees when Gangaram attempts to possess Rambabu's body. At last, Mahesh successfully eliminates Gangaram. Finally, the movie ends with the marriages of Rambabu & Lakshmi and Mahesh & Sowmya.

Cast

Rajendra Prasad as Rambabu
Suman as Mahesh
Seema as Sowmya
Uma as Lakshmi
Satya Prakash as Gangaram
Sudhakar as Constable Cola
Tanikella Bharani as Janardhan Seth
Annapurna as Parvatamma
M. S. Narayana as Principal
Mallikarjuna Rao as Constable Nukkaraju
Maganthi Sudhakar as S.P.
Tirupati Prakash
KK Sarma
Sattibabu
Jeeva as Deva
Jenny as Priest

Soundtrack

Music composed by Shanmuk. Lyrics were written by Kula Shekar. Music released on Mayuri Audio Company.

Other
 VCDs and DVDs on - VOLGA Videos, Hyderabad

References

External links

2000s Telugu-language films
Indian horror film remakes
Indian comedy horror films
Telugu remakes of Marathi films
Films directed by Relangi Narasimha Rao